This is a list of films released in IMAX which uses IMAX, a motion-picture film format and projection standard. IMAX cameras and film stock are rarely used for mainstream films; the cameras are heavy and the film stock is expensive. However, since 2002, some feature films shot with IMAX digital cameras or on original 35mm film stock have undergone IMAX Digital Media Remastering (DMR) processing for showing both in 70mm IMAX theaters and in IMAX Digital theaters.

Several animated titles (Fantasia 2000, Beauty and the Beast, Treasure Planet, The Lion King, Falling in Love Again, CyberWorld, Fly Me to the Moon 3D, and Santa vs. the Snowman 3D) were released in 70mm IMAX prints; however, they were not subject to DMR processing. Cinematographer Roger Deakins supervised custom transfers for Skyfall, Blade Runner 2049, and 1917 rather than using IMAX's DMR process.

List
This list includes the films which have been released in IMAX theaters. Films that were presented in IMAX theatres using 35mm or digital prints, but were never specifically mastered for IMAX, are not included.

2000s

2000

2002

2003

2004

2005

2006

2007

2008

2009

2010s

2010

2011

2012

2013

2014

2015

2016

2017

2018

2019

2020s

2020

2021

2022

2023

Notes

References

Lists of IMAX films